Chakra Prasad Bastola was a Nepalese politician who served as the Foreign Minister of Nepal from 10 April 2000 to 26 July 2002, as well as Minister of Home Affairs from 2004 to 2006 and the Nepalese ambassador to India from 1990 to 1999.He was one of the key members of the hijacking of Royal Nepal Airlines Flight 34 in 1973 that was carrying funds that the Nepali Congress needed to overthrow the Monarchy for which he was sentenced to jail for 18 months in Bihar, India.

Personal life 
Bastola was born in 1944 in Jhapa District of Nepal and died on 13 October 2018 in Kathmandu, Nepal. Bastola was married twice. His first wife was Madhu Acharya, the sister of Shailaja Acharya. His wife was also a niece of BP Koirala, Matrika Prasad Koirala, and Girija Prasad Koiralal. He had two daughters.

Education

Bastola was a Rhodes Scholar. After his time in prison he went to the University of Oxford, United Kingdom, to study for a Master's degree in political science. He then studied for a PHD at Banaras Hindu University in India.

Political Life 
Bastola was responsible for providing weapons for the Royal Nepal Airlines hijacking. After the failure of the hijacking Bastola was imprisoned in Nakhu, Kathmandu and later in Patna Bihar. 

After Bastola's study in India, on returning to Nepal in 1990 he ran for the legislative assembly from his home district of Jhapa. In 1994 Bastola was sent to New Delhi as Nepal's ambassador. He resigned the ambassadorship in 2001 and returned to Nepal.

Bastola went on four foreign trips to India, China, Russia and the United States.

He was awarded the Nepal Ratna Man Padavi.

Legacy 

He was given a state funeral on 13th October 2018, and buried in the Nepali Congress Headquarters in Kathmandu.

References 

1944 births
2018 deaths
Nepalese politicians
Nepalese diplomats
Foreign Ministers of Nepal
Ambassadors of Nepal to India
Members of the National Assembly (Nepal)
People from Jhapa District
Nepal MPs 1994–1999
Nepali Congress politicians from Koshi Province
Nepal MPs 1999–2002